Zaireichthys brevis is a species of loach catfish endemic to the Democratic Republic of the Congo where it is found in the Congo River Basin.  It reaches a length of 3.4 cm.

References
 

Amphiliidae
Fish of Africa
Endemic fauna of the Democratic Republic of the Congo
Fish described in 1915